Saionji Saneuji (西園寺実氏 1194 – 7 July 1269) was a waka poet and Japanese nobleman active in the early Kamakura period.

Family
Parents
Father: Saionji Kintsune (西園寺公経, 1171 – 24 October 1244)
Mother: Ichijō Masako (一条全子), daughter of Ichijō Yoshiyasu (一条能保)
Consorts and issues: 
Wife: Shijo Sadako (四条貞子,  1196 – 22 October 1302)  daughter of Shijo Takahira (四条隆衡)
Saionji Kisshi (西園寺 姞子; 1225 – 20 October 1292), Consort of Emperor Go-Saga, first daughter
Fujiwara no Kimiko (藤原（西園寺）公子; 1232 – 6 March 1304), Consort of Emperor Go-Fukakusa, second daughter
Concubine: Fujiwara Sachiko (藤原幸子),  daughter of Fujiwara Chika (藤原親雅)
Saionji Kinmoto (西園寺公基, 1220 – 12 January 1275), first son
Concubine: Court Lady (家女房)
Saionji Kinsuke  (西園寺公相, 1223 – 30 October 1267), second son
Concubine: Unknown Concubine
Dōshō (道勝, d. 1273), third son
Dōya (道耀, 1234 – 1304), fourth son
Mamorusuke (守助, 1241 – 1295, fifth son
Saionji Norikō (西園寺教子), third daughter

See also 
Saionji family

References

External links 
E-text of his poems in Japanese

1194 births
1269 deaths
13th-century Japanese poets